Namgyal Rinpoche, Karma Tenzin Dorje (1931–2003), born Leslie George Dawson in Toronto, Canada, was a Tibetan Buddhist lama in the Karma Kagyu tradition.

Early life
Namgyal Rinpoche was born Leslie George Dawson in 1931, October 11, and raised in Toronto, Canada by parents of Irish and Scottish descent and attended Jarvis Baptist Seminary, before going on to the University of Michigan in Ann Arbor, USA, where he studied philosophy and psychology and became active in Socialist politics. After visiting Moscow to address an international youth conference, he became disillusioned with politics, and moved to London in 1954.

Theravada studies in Asia
While in London he studied Buddhism and in 1956 met the Sayadaw U Thila Wunta, a Burmese monk who accepted Leslie Dawson as a student. That same year he traveled to Bodh Gaya, India to rejoin the Sayadaw and received ordination as a sāmaṇera (novice monk). He continued on to Burma where he was ordained as Anandabodhi bhikkhu at the Shwedagon Pagoda in Yangon on 21 December 1958. He began intensive training and meditation practice under the guidance of U Thila Wunta and Mahasi Sayadaw, then in Thailand with Chao Khun Phra Rajasiddhimuni at Wat Mahadhatu in Bangkok. In Sri Lanka he studied the Pāli Canon, the Visuddhimagga, and other classical texts before receiving the title acharya (teacher of Dhamma).

Return to the United Kingdom and Canada
In 1962 Ananda Bodhi returned to England at the invitation of the English Sangha Trust. He was a special guest speaker at the Fifth International Congress of Psychotherapists in London where he met Julian Huxley, Anna Freud and R.D. Laing, among others. In 1965 he founded the Johnstone House Contemplative Community, a retreat center near Dumfries in Scotland. A year earlier he had met Chögyam Trungpa Rinpoche and Akong Tulku, Tibetan lamas at Oxford sent by the 16th Karmapa to study and live in the West. Ananda Bodhi provided the lamas with assistance and saw to the transfer of ownership of Johnstone House to the Tibetan Karma Kagyu Order which transformed the old hunting lodge into Samye Ling, one of the first Buddhist centers in the West. (Earlier Tibetan centres were the Kalachakra Temple of Saint Petersburg, Russia, founded in 1915; the temple founded by Kalmykian refugees in Belgrade, Serbia, in 1929, and the Lamaist Buddhist Center in Howell, New Jersey, US, founded in 1958).

In 1965 Ananda Bodhi returned to Canada with two of his senior students, Tony Olbrecht and Barry Goulden, where he established a new community, The Dharma Centre of Canada (1966, incorporated as a charity 1970), and founded the Centennial Lodge of the Theosophical Society (1967). Over the years that followed, he began to stress the study of Western psychology and philosophy, exercise, diet, and the appreciation of fine art and music as a supplement to traditional Buddhist training, and began taking students with him on voyages to various countries around the world, often on cargo ships.

As Namgyal Rinpoche
During a pilgrimage with students to India and Sikkim in 1968, Ananda Bodhi was recognized by the 16th Karmapa, the supreme head of the Karma Kagyu school of Tibetan Buddhism, as an accomplished master and received Vajrayana robes [2]. In 1971 he led a large group of students to India where they had an audiences with Sakya Trizen at Dehra Dun and the Dalai Lama at Dharamshala. At Rumtek Monastery in Sikkim they received empowerments by the 16th Karmapa who gave Ananda Bodhi his Tibetan name. On his return to Canada he was enthroned (October 1971) with due ceremony as Karma Tenzin Dorje Namgyal Rinpoche at Green River, Ontario, by Karma Thinley Rinpoche, as instructed by the Karmapa. The following year he led another large group of students to Morocco for a four-month retreat, then back to India for an extended audience with Sakya Trizin of the Sakya Order. In 1973 a large group of students joined him in New Zealand on Lake Rotoiti for a three-month meditation retreat.

Thereafter, Namgyal Rinpoche practised and taught in the Vajrayana tradition of Tibetan Buddhism as well as Theravadin and Mahayana schools. He was empowered and recognised by many teachers such as Sakya Trizin and Chogye Rinpoche of the Sakyas, Dudjom Rinpoche of the Nyingma sect, and various Kagyu lamas including Kalu Rinpoche, one of the Karmapa's main teachers. In subsequent years Namgyal Rinpoche inspired the establishment of dharma centers around the world. He continued to teach until his death in Switzerland on October 22, 2003, having empowered a number of senior students to continue his work.

See also
Samye Ling

Publications

References

Works about
 "A Time To Remember", Lama Sonam Gyatso, unpublished biography, 2003.
 
 Namgyal Rinpoche in New Zealand, a short history of the contributions of Namgyal Rinpoche and his students to bringing the Buddha Dharma to New Zealand, by Tarchin Hearn.
 Biographies: The Venerable Kyabje Namgyal Rinpoche at the Dharma Fellowship of the Gyalwa Karmapa

External links
 Dharma Centre of Canada
 A Namgyal Rinpoche Webpage

1931 births
2003 deaths
Karma Kagyu lamas
Tulkus
Canadian lamas
Namgyal Rinpoche
Tibetan Buddhist spiritual teachers
Students of Mahasi Sayadaw
University of Michigan College of Literature, Science, and the Arts alumni
20th-century lamas
21st-century lamas
Canadian Buddhists